is a Japanese voice actress from Saitama Prefecture who is affiliated with VIMS. She started her career in 2018 after passing an audition, and in 2019 she played her first main role as Emma in the anime television series The Magnificent Kotobuki. She also played Cayna, the protagonist of the anime series In the Land of Leadale in 2022.

Biography
Yukimura was born in Saitama Prefecture on December 6, 1998. She had an interest in voice acting from an early age, partly inspired by conversations she had with her older sisters. When she was in elementary school she would try writing down the names of voice actors from anime and video games that they talked about.

Yukimura applied for the Japan Narration Actor Institute during her third year of junior high school, and started taking classes there after entering high school. She chose to take classes there as classes were only once a week and would thus not interfere with her studies. She noted that she was the youngest in her class and felt nervous as there was even a trainee who was fifteen years older than her. As her training progressed, she had doubts on whether to continue pursuing a career in voice acting. She decided to continue pursuing voice acting partly as a result of the death of her grandmother, who had been opposed to her becoming a voice actress; Yukimura noted that she wanted to prove her grandmother that her decision to continue this path was right. After passing an audition, she became affiliated with the talent agency VIMS.

The year after starting her career, Yukimura was cast in her first main role as Emma in the anime television series The Magnificent Kotobuki. She was also cast as Fuyuko Mayuzumi in the mobile game The Idolmaster Shiny Colors. In 2020 she was cast as the character Kotoko Imai in the franchise Mewkledreamy. In 2021 she played the roles of Mikoto Fujishima in WIXOSS Diva(A)Live and Raine in the second season of That Time I Got Reincarnated as a Slime. In 2022, she was cast as Cayna in In the Land of Leadale and Anri Teieri in Blue Lock.

Filmography

Anime
2018
A Certain Magical Index III, Tsushima

2019
The Magnificent Kotobuki, Emma

2020
Mewkledreamy, Kotoko Imai

2021
WIXOSS Diva(A)Live, Mikoto Fujishima
That Time I Got Reincarnated as a Slime, Raine

2022
In the Land of Leadale, Cayna
In the Heart of Kunoichi Tsubaki, Hototogisu
Smile of the Arsnotoria the Animation, Picatrix
Blue Lock, Anri Teieri

Games
2018
The Idolmaster Shiny Colors, Fuyuko Mayuzumi

2019
Dead or Alive Xtreme Venus Vacation, Monica

2020
Magia Record, Ranka Chizu
Azur Lane, Vauquelin, Tartu
Pokémon Masters EX, Gloria

2021
Smile of the Arsnotoria, Picatrix

References

External links
Agency profile 

1998 births
Living people
Japanese voice actresses
Voice actresses from Saitama Prefecture